Wehrshausen is a borough (Ortsbezirk) of Marburg in Hesse.

The 1st German Antique Police Car Museum is based there.

References

External links 
 Information about Wehrshausen at www.marburg.de 
 

Districts of Marburg
Marburg-Biedenkopf